"Gotta Get Thru This" is the debut single of New Zealand-British singer Daniel Bedingfield. The song was released in November 2001 as the lead single from his debut studio album of the same name (2002). The track, along with some others, was recorded in Bedingfield's bedroom with his PC and a microphone, using the music software Reason.

The single went to number one on the UK Singles Chart in both 2001 and 2002, making it one of Bedingfield's most successful singles on the chart. Outside the United Kingdom, the single peaked within the top ten of the charts in Australia, Canada and the United States. In the latter country, it received a Grammy Award nomination for Best Dance Recording but lost to "Days Go By" by Dirty Vegas. The single became Britain's sixteenth biggest-selling single of 2001 and has since been certified platinum. Capital Xtra included the song on their list of "The Best Old-School Garage Anthems of All Time".

Song background
Bedingfield was inspired to write the song while walking across Tower Bridge in London, frustrated at being separated from a girl he was in love with from Leeds, in the north of England. The girl was a red-haired American dancer named Gina, and he was upset that the distance between them was preventing him from pursuing her. Bedingfield went home and recorded the song in his bedroom with a microphone plugged to his home computer using a Making Waves computer audio program. The song cost £1,500 to record, and after pressing some of his own copies of the song, Bedingfield sent them to various DJs, and DJ EZ included it on a compilation. After hearing it, Polydor signed him, and the song became a big hit.

Music video
The music video features Bedingfield looking for a woman in a number of locations in London, most notably West India Quay, a bridge connecting West India to Canary Wharf, and the Canary Wharf Docklands area. He is pursuing a woman he may know and comes inches close while chasing her around Docklands Light Railway, and eventually meets her at Canary Wharf. Canadian director Little X directed the video.

A second version of the video, also directed by Little X, was created for North America. In the beginning of the North American music video, an acoustic version of "Gotta Get Thru This" is featured and then the official D'n'D version starts playing after.

Track listings

UK CD single
 "Gotta Get Thru This" (D'n'D radio edit)
 "Gotta Get Thru This" (D'n'D full length version)
 "Gotta Get Thru This" (Stella Browne vocal mix)
 "Gotta Get Thru This" (CD-ROM video)

UK 12-inch single
A1. "Gotta Get Thru This" (D'n'D full length version)
B1. "Gotta Get Thru This" (original version)
B2. "Gotta Get Thru This" (Stella Browne vocal mix)

UK cassette single
 "Gotta Get Thru This" (D'n'D radio edit)
 "Gotta Get Thru This" (D'n'D full length version)

European CD single
 "Gotta Get Thru This" (D'n'D radio edit) – 2:41
 "Gotta Get Thru This" (CD-ROM video)

Canadian CD single
 "Gotta Get Thru This" (D'n'D radio edit) – 2:41
 "Gotta Get Thru This" (D'n'D full length version) – 4:44
 "Gotta Get Thru This" (Stella Browne vocal mix) – 7:33

Australian CD single
 "Gotta Get Thru This" (radio edit) – 2:41
 "Gotta Get Thru This" (D'n'D full length version) – 4:39
 "Gotta Get Thru This" (Stella Browne vocal mix) – 7:33
 "Gotta Get Thru This" (original version) – 4:31

Charts

Weekly charts

Year-end charts

Decade-end charts

Certifications

Release history

See also
 List of UK Singles Chart number ones of 2001
 List of UK Singles Chart number ones of 2002
 List of number-one dance singles of 2002 (U.S.)

References

External links
 Music video (US version) on ArtistDirect.com
 Music video (UK version) on YouTube

2001 debut singles
2001 songs
Daniel Bedingfield songs
Island Records singles
Ministry of Sound singles
Relentless Records singles
Songs written by Daniel Bedingfield
UK garage songs
UK Singles Chart number-one singles